The Southern Sting were a netball team based in Invercargill, New Zealand that competed in the National Bank Cup competition, formerly known as the Coca-Cola Cup.

The Southern Sting team won the National Bank Cup seven times and are the only team to have competed in all 10 of the finals of the competition.

In 2008, the Sting were merged with Otago Rebels to compete as the Southern Steel in the trans-tasman ANZ Championship.
The new Southern Steel are still based in Invercargill and play the majority of their matches on the Sting's home court, Stadium Southland.

Notable players
Bernice Mene (Silver Ferns Captain)
Lesley Rumball (Silver Ferns Captain)
Adine Wilson (Silver Ferns Captain)
Donna Wilkins (Silver Ferns Captain)
Jenny Ferguson (New Zealand A Captain)
Natalie Avellino (Australian Vice-Captain)
Janine Topia (New Zealand A)
Julie Carter (Silver Ferns Captain)
Naomi Siddall (England Vice-Captain)
Bulou Rabuka (Fijian Captain)
Megan Hutton (New Zealand A Captain)
Daneka Wipiiti (Silver Ferns Squad)
Liana Leota (Silver Ferns Squad)
Belinda Colling (Silver Ferns Captain)
Tania Dalton (Silver Ferns Squad)
Erika Burgess (Silver Ferns Squad)
Leana de Bruin (Silver Ferns Squad)
Wendy Frew née Telfer (Silver Ferns Squad)

Inaugural season

1998 Season (Sting first)
 Rd1: Sting v Auckland Diamonds (55–51)
 Rd2: Sting v Canterbury Flames (55–53)
 Rd3: Sting v Waikato Wildcats (78–41)
 Rd4: Sting v Otago Rebels (54–61) 
 Rd5: Sting v Capital Shakers (50–48) 
 Rd6: Sting v Northern Force (56–39)
 Rd7: Sting v CMTV Cometz (42–44)
 Rd8: Sting v BOP Magic (50–43)
 Rd9: Sting v Western Flyers (68–48) 
 Semi: Sting v Canterbury Flames (59–58) 
 Final: Sting v Otago Rebels (50–57)

Sting's website entry: 1998 season

1998 was the beginning of the Sting phenomenon. Ascot Park Hotel Southern Sting was not even ranked by pundits at the start of the new Coca-Cola Cup season and franchise holder Southern TeamCo was hoping for a top four finish.

But the team had other ideas, and so did its supporters. From day one, Southlanders were behind the team and players were astonished when they arrived for their first game at Centennial Hall on Friday, 27 March. The car park and surrounding streets were full and the game was a sell-out.

The starting line-up against the Auckland Diamonds was Donna Loffhagen and Camille Grubb shooting, Kirsty Broughton, Tasha Marshall and Reinga Bloxham through the mid-court and Bernice Mene and Michelle Krynen on defence. Debbie Munro came into the shooting circle in the third quarter and Southern Sting won 55–51, a major boost to the team, which then went on to Christchurch to another win, this time against the Canterbury Flames, 55–53, on Sunday, 29 March.

The team had another double-header the next weekend, with both games at home in front of sell-out crowds. The first game, against the Waikato Wildcats, was a walk-over, with Sting winning easily 78–41. On the Sunday it was a different story. Sting was up against the favourites, the Otago Rebels, and lost 54–61, but the fans never bagged the team.

Sting played the next game away and after being five down with four minutes left, came back to beat the Shakers 50–48.

Halfway through the season and a record of four wins, one loss, Sting was looking good and took another win, 56–39, against the Northern Force away from home. However, its star shooter Loffhagen was injured and missed the next game, against the CMTV Cometz, which the Sting lost narrowly, 42–44.

A week later, Loffhagen was still unable to play and the Sting played the Bay of Plenty Magic away from home, beating it 50–43. Then it was back home for the final round robin game, against the Western Flyers and with Loffhagen playing. It was on fire to win 68–48.

Sting was second equal with the Flames on the points table, behind the Rebels, but Sting had scored 80 more goals than the Flames and so took the home semi-final after some issues around television coverage. It took only half an hour to sell all the available tickets for the semi-final and 60 minutes to just beat the Flames 59–58, thanks in part to the unbroken noise from the fans. The Rebels beat the Diamonds to gain the home advantage in the final a week later, but that was no deterrent to intrepid Sting fans. Operation Sting swung into place, with university students, from Southland, paid to wait overnight to buy extra tickets for Southlanders. Then the Southlanders themselves lined up, some for 35 hours, to get the tickets.

A convoy of 13 buses chartered by the Invercargill Licensing Trust took many of the Southland fans to Dunedin for the final, which see-sawed between the Rebels being well out in front, to the Sting leading, to the Rebels pulling away finally to win 57–50. But as a letter to The Southland Times said, the team "did us proud."

Final season

2007 Squad
Natalie Avellino 
Sarah Barnes 
Liana Barrett-Chase 
Erika Burgess 
Hayley Crofts 
Jenny Ferguson 
Megan Hutton  
Donna Loffhagen (now Wilkins) 
Te Huinga Reo Selby-Rickit 
Wendy Telfer 
Adine Wilson 
Daneka Wipiiti

2007 Season (Sting first) 
 Rd1: Sting vs Force (46–51)
 Rd2: Sting vs Flyers (67–34)
 Rd3: Sting vs Shakers (81–33)
 Rd4: Sting vs Magic (65–44)
 Rd5: Sting vs Rebels (60–50)
 Rd6: Sting vs Diamonds (50–42)
 Rd7: Sting vs Flames (54–46)
 Semi 1: Sting vs Force (39–47)
 Semi 2: Sting vs Magic (50–48)
 Final: Sting vs Force (50–49)

The Sting took the 2007 title to regain the National Bank Cup for the 7th and final time from the Northern Force in Auckland 50–49. Coach Robyn Broughton featured in her 100th match, and the cup returned to its home after two seasons with the Waikato/BOP Magic. 
Through the regular season, the Sting defeated out some tough opposition, including the Auckland Diamonds and Otago Rebels. 
Magic were knocked out of the competition a week earlier in Invercargill by the Sting, 50–48. Former Silver Fern Julie Coney believing it was the competition's best ever match.

Through the season, the Invercargill based team won all but one round robin game. Favourites to take the title, their season was put in question when they went down to the Silver Fern studded Northern Force in the major semi-final. But fighting back, Sting celebrated with a city parade a month later after the final, where Invercargill mayor Tim Shadbolt congratulated the team. The competition's cup still sits proudly in the Stadium Southland trophy cabinet, alongside the national league's old cup – the Coca-Cola.

Coach

Robyn Broughton coached the Southern Sting for all ten years of the National Bank Cup. During her time she won seven National Bank Cup and Coca-Cola Cup titles, and led her team to every single final. She also spent three years as assistant coach of the Silver Ferns from 1998 to 2000. Robyn has also held other national coaching positions including the head coach of the New Zealand A squad, and is currently in charge of the Silver Ferns Fastnet team. 
Robyn would be joined by several assistant's during the ten years of the Sting. Julie Carter, Tania Dalton and Belinda Colling all had stints as assistant coach for various reasons including injury.
In 2008, when the ANZ Championship started, Broughton successfully applied for the role as coach of the Southern Steel. She guided the team to the finals series twice in four seasons and retired from coaching in 2011.

Competition record

2007– 1st
2006– 1st
2005– 2nd
2004– 1st
2003– 1st
2002– 1st
2001– 1st
2000– 1st
1999– 1st
1998– 2nd

External links
Southern Sting official website
Southern Sting 

Defunct netball teams in New Zealand
National Bank Cup teams
Sports clubs established in 1998
1998 establishments in New Zealand
Sports clubs disestablished in 2007
2007 disestablishments in New Zealand
Southern Steel